Anthony Jung (born 3 November 1991) is a German professional footballer who plays as a left-back for  club Werder Bremen.

Club career

Early career
Jung played youth football for multiple clubs in the Wiesbaden area before joining the Eintracht Frankfurt youth academy in 2005. In 2010 he was included in the club's second team, where he became a regular in the German fourth tier. In January 2012, first team head coach, Armin Veh included Jung in the first team training camp in Qatar. After the 2011–12 season, he joined FSV Frankfurt on a free transfer, signing a one-year deal with the option of extending the deal with another year. In the first match of the 2012–13 season, a 1–1 draw against SV Sandhausen, Jung made his professional debut.

RB Leipzig
Jung joined RB Leipzig in June 2013, who had just been promoted to the 2. Bundesliga. He signed a three-year deal with the club. In 2015, he extended his contract to 2019.

Loan to Ingolstadt
In August 2016, Jung was loaned to Bundesliga club FC Ingolstadt for the 2016–17 season. There, he made his debut in the Bundesliga in a 2–1 home loss against TSG 1899 Hoffenheim. On 10 December 2016, Jung gave an assist to Roger from a free kick to inflict RB Leipzig's first defeat in the 2016–17 Bundesliga, ending their run of 13 unbeaten league games.

As Ingolstadt were relegated to the 2. Bundesliga after the season, he returned to RB Leipzig.

Brøndby
In July 2017, Jung joined Danish Superliga club Brøndby IF on a one-year loan deal reuniting with former RB Leipzig coach Alexander Zorniger. On 23 July 2017, he made his Superliga debut in 3–2 away loss to Nordsjælland. Jung scored his first goal for the club on 19 April 2018, the match-winner, in a 3–2 away win over Midtjylland, giving his club a three-point advantage in the title mount. During the 2017–18 season, Jung made 29 league appearances in which he scored one goal, as Brøndby finished second in the league behind Midtjylland. On 10 May 2018, he made an appearance as Brøndby defeated Silkeborg 3–1 in the Danish Cup final; the club's first silverware in 10 years.

In June 2018, RB Leipzig and Brøndby reached an agreement for a permanent transfer of Jung. He signed a three-year deal with the Danish club. He soon evolved into a starter for the club, first as a left-back, and later under head coach Niels Frederiksen, as a centre-back in his 3–5–2 formation. Jung scored his second goal for the club on 16 February 2020 in a 2–0 away win over OB, a tap-in early in the match. His third goal came a week later, on 23 February, in a 3–2 away loss to AaB as he volleyed in the 2–2 equaliser from the edge of the box. He scored again on 7 June, after the season had been resumed as part of the COVID-19 pandemic, the first goal in a 3–2 away loss to AC Horsens. However, he was also sent off during the match as he received two yellow cards. Jung finished the 2019–20 season with 40 appearances across all competitions, including qualifiers for the UEFA Europa League, scoring three goals – all in the Superliga.

During the 2020–21 season, Jung developed into a key player for Brøndby as the team topped the league table during the first half of the season. With his contract expiring in June 2021, fans began a petition in February 2021 for him to sign a contract extension.

Werder Bremen
In June 2021, Werder Bremen, newly relegated to the 2. Bundesliga, announced the signing of Jung from Brøndby for the 2021–22 season. He made his debut for the club in a 1–1 draw against Hannover 96. He reached promotion back to the Bundesliga with Werder in his first season at the club, making 30 appearances in which he scored two goals.

International career
Jung was born in Villajoyosa, Spain, to a German father and Spanish mother. He emigrated at the age of three with his divorced father to Germany. He is a youth international for Germany.

Career statistics

Club

Honours
Brøndby
Danish Superliga: 2020–21
Danish Cup: 2017–18

References

External links

1991 births
Living people
People from Villajoyosa
German people of Spanish descent
Spanish people of German descent
Sportspeople from the Province of Alicante
German footballers
Spanish footballers
Association football fullbacks
Germany youth international footballers
Bundesliga players
2. Bundesliga players
3. Liga players
Danish Superliga players
FV Biebrich players
Eintracht Frankfurt II players
FSV Frankfurt players
RB Leipzig players
FC Ingolstadt 04 players
Brøndby IF players
SV Werder Bremen players
German expatriate footballers
German expatriate sportspeople in Denmark
Expatriate men's footballers in Denmark